Aulepa (Estonian Swedish: Dihlet) is a village in Lääne-Nigula Parish, Lääne County, in western Estonia.

Before the administrative reform in 2017, the village was in Noarootsi Parish.

Demographics
As of 2011 Census, the settlement's population was 12.

References

Villages in Lääne County